Pavelas Andreevich Leusas (born 15 September 1978 in Vilnius) is a Lithuanian professional football goalkeeper, who plays for Navbahor Namangan in Uzbek League.

Career
He has played for Žalgiris Vilnius and 2008 was goalkeeper of Nasaf Qarshi. Leusas had a brief stint in the Polish Ekstraklasa with Orlen Płock during the 2000-01 season. He also had spells in the Russian First Division, with FC Fakel Voronezh during the 2002 season, and the Kazakhstan Premier League, with FC Almaty and FC Zhetysu.

In February 2013 he moved to FC Shurtan Guzar.

International career
Leusas has made eight appearances for the Lithuania national football team between 1998 and 2001.

References

1978 births
Living people
Lithuanian footballers
Lithuania international footballers
FK Žalgiris players
Expatriate footballers in Finland
FC Fakel Voronezh players
FC Vilnius players
FK Panerys Vilnius players
FK Utenis Utena players
A Lyga players
Expatriate footballers in Poland
Lithuanian expatriate sportspeople in Kazakhstan
Expatriate footballers in Russia
Lithuanian expatriate sportspeople in Poland
Expatriate footballers in Kazakhstan
Lithuanian expatriate sportspeople in Russia
Buxoro FK players
Footballers from Vilnius
Association football goalkeepers
Lithuanian expatriate sportspeople in Uzbekistan
Expatriate footballers in Uzbekistan
Lithuanian expatriate sportspeople in Finland